Sánchez is a Spanish family name.

Historical origins
"The illustrious Sanchez Family... is descended from one of a number of Gothic knights (caballeros) who in the year 714 escaped from the "barbara furia" of the Mohammedan invasion and took up their residence in the hills of Leon, Galicia, Asturia, Burgos, and the Pyrenees.  They took part under the Gothic king of the Asturias Pelayo (Pelagius), in the battle of Covadonga (730?) against the Mohammedans, and then returned to the Pyrenees where they elected as their leader Don Garcia Ximenez.  From here they passed down into Navarre and Aragon..."

In the 8th century, Duke Lupus Sanchez assisted the first Holy Roman Emperor, Charlemagne, in capturing the fortress city of Barcelona from the Muslims.  Duke Lupus Sanchez commanded military assets comparable to or greater than those of Alfred the Great of Wessex (England) and was able to mobilize a militia of 27,000 or more to garrison the fortress cities of Gascony.

There were several kings named Sancho in the Christian Kingdoms of Spain, between the 8th and 15th centuries.  Their children took on the surname Sanchez.  For example Sancho III Garces "The Great", King of Pamplona (980–1035), fathered Garcia III (IV) Sanchez, King of Navarra (1015–1054); Ramiro I Sanchez, King of Aragon (1010–1063); Fernando I Sanchez "The Great," King of Castile and Emperor of Leon (1020–1063); Gonzalo Sanchez, King of Huesca (1022–1054; and Urraca Sanchez, Infanta (Crown Princess).

Interestingly, Garcia III Sanchez, the King of Navarra, had an illegitimate son, whose grandson married the daughter of Rodrigo Diaz de Vivar ("El Cid"). Their son, Garcia Ramirez "The Restorer" became King of Navarre (Navarra).

The origins of the name Sanchez lie in the ancient Christian Kingdoms of northern Spain and southern France (the name is more than 1,300 years old), the Spanish Conquistadors carried it to the New World.  During the 1500s to the 1700s, colonists with the name Sánchez settled in areas that are now part of the southwestern United States (arriving in what is now New Mexico in the 1598 Juan de Oñate Expedition), Mexico, and South America, so there are numerous people in these areas with the surname of Sanchez.  In addition, the name is found in nearly every western European country, as well as other parts of the world.

The ancestors of individuals with the surname of Sanchez may include those who invaded and/or settled in Spain during its long history. Such as the Celts, Vikings, Phoenicians, Iberians, Romans, Visigoths, Mohammedans, and Sephardic Jews.  In addition, those who moved to the New World may also, to varying degrees, share other European, Native American, African, or other ancestries.

There are, literally, dozens of coats of arms for the name Sanchez, dating from ancient to more recent times.  Generally, coats of arms were given to individuals with the name Sanchez, who then passed them down to descendants, usually through the male line. However, coats of arms for large groups of Sanchezes in certain geographical regions may exist. The most widespread coat of arms features a crowned gold eagle on a field of azure (royal blue).

Popularity
Sanchez is the fifth most common surname in Spain.

People with the surname
Aarón Sanchez, American celebrity chef
Cristian Sanchez, Chilean Journalist/Presenter
Felipe Sánchez Román y Gallifa (1893–1956), Spanish jurist 
Francisco Sánchez Chamuscado (1512-1582), Spanish conquistador and Captain of the Chamuscado and Rodríguez Expedition of 1581-1582
Ilich Ramírez Sánchez (born 1949), Venezuelan terrorist also known as Carlos the Jackal 
Javier Sánchez, several people including:
Javier Sánchez (born 1968), Spanish tennis player; brother of Arantxa and Emilio
Jose Tomas Sanchez, Filipino Prefect emeritus of the Congregation for the Clergy, Roman Curia
Luis Sánchez (disambiguation), several people
Manuel Sánchez, Mexican economist
Penelope Cruz Sanchez, Actress, goes by career name “Penelope Cruz”
Ricardo Sanchez (born 1953), retired American Army Lieutenant General
Rick Sanchez, Journalist-MSNBC & CNN
Robert Fortune Sanchez, American Roman Catholic archbishop
Roselyn Sánchez, Puerto Rican singer, model and actress
Susan M. Sanchez, American applied statistician and operations researcher

Arts

General
Abel Sanchez (also known as Oqwa Pi), San Ildefonso Pueblo painter, muralist, and politician
Aldo Sambrell, a European actor also known as "Alfredo Sanchez Brell"
Eduardo Sánchez, Cuban-American filmmaker
Encarna Sánchez, Spanish television show host
Jorge Noceda Sanchez, Dominican surrealist painter
Julio Sánchez Cristo, Colombian radio personality
Kiele Sanchez, American actress
Korina Sanchez, Filipino news anchor and host
Lauren Sanchez, American celebrity
Lucia Sanchez, French actress
Matt Sanchez, American soldier, political activist, writer and former pornographic actor
M. Jenea Sanchez, Mexican-American artist
Nancy Friedemann-Sánchez, Colombian-American visual artist, based in Lincoln, Nebraska
Nia Sanchez, Miss USA 2014
Rick Sanchez, Cuban-American TV news anchor
Sylvia Sanchez, Filipina actress

Musical Artists
Adán Sánchez (1984–2004), Mexican-American singer
Chalino Sánchez (1960–1992), Mexican singer and songwriter
Claudio Sanchez, American rock singer and guitarist of the band 'Coheed and Cambria'
Lourdes Sánchez, Argentine singer, dancer, model, TV host and actress
Magdalena Sánchez, Venezuelan singer
Marta Sánchez, Spanish female vocalist
Mike Sanchez, English Rhythm and Blues pianist/vocalist
Stephen Sanchez, American singer-songwriter

Writers
Adolfo Sánchez Vázquez, Mexican writer and professor
Alex Sanchez, American author of teen stories
Erika L. Sánchez, poet and writer
Luis Rafael Sánchez, Puerto Rican playwright and author
Sergio G. Sánchez, Spanish director and screenwriter

Politicians
Alicia Sánchez-Camacho, Spanish politician
Arman Sanchez, Filipino politician, former Governor of the province of Batangas
Augusto Martínez Sánchez, Cuban politician
Edna Sanchez, Filipino politician
Felipe Sánchez Román (1850–1916), Spanish lawyer and politician 
Francisco Sanchez (politician), Eighth Alcade of San Francisco
Francisco del Rosario Sánchez, founding father of the Dominican Republic
Gonzalo Sánchez de Lozada, Bolivian president
Linda Sánchez, American member of Congress
Loretta Sanchez, American member of Congress
Óscar Arias Sánchez, Costa Rican president and Nobel Peace Prize winner
Pedro Sánchez, Prime Minister of Spain
Pedro C. Sanchez, Guamanian politician
Roberto Sánchez Vilella, former Governor of Puerto Rico

Sports

General
Alicia Sánchez (born 1948), Peruvian volleyball player
Anahí Ester Sánchez (born 1991), Argentine boxer
Angélica Sánchez, Mexican long-distance runner
Arantxa Sánchez Vicario (born 1972), Spanish tennis player
Bertha Sánchez, Colombian long-distance runner
Carlos Silva Sánchez (born 1944), Chilean chess master
Clara Sanchez (cyclist), French professional track cyclist 
Cristhian Cruz Sánchez (born 1992), Peruvian chess grandmaster
Dani Sánchez, Catalan carom billiards player
Diego Sanchez, American mixed martial artist
Félix Sánchez, Dominican-American athlete
Fernando Fernández Sánchez (born 1990), Peruvian chess master
Laura Sánchez (diver), Mexican diver
Mark Sanchez, NFL Quarterback
Michael Sánchez, Cuban volleyball player
Pepe Sánchez (born 1977), Argentine professional basketball player
Philippe Sanchez, French cross country skier
Ricardo Sánchez, Spanish water polo player
Rosario Sánchez, Mexican race walker
Samuel Sánchez, Spanish road bicycle racer
Yadier Sánchez (born 1987), Cuban volleyball player

Baseball
Ali Sánchez (born 1997), Venezuelan professional baseball player
Aníbal Sánchez (born 1984), Venezuelan professional baseball player
Cristopher Sánchez (born 1996), Dominican professional baseball player
Freddy Sanchez (born 1977), American former professional baseball player
Gaby Sánchez (born 1983), American former professional baseball player
Gary Sanchez (born 1992), Dominican professional baseball player
Joel Sanchez (baseball), American college baseball coach
Jonathan Sánchez (born 1982), Puerto Rican professional baseball player
Rómulo Sánchez (born 1984), Venezuelan former professional baseball player
Sixto Sánchez (born 1998), Dominican professional baseball player

Association football (Soccer)

Alexis Sánchez, Chilean footballer for Inter Milan and Chile national football team
Ángel Sánchez (referee), Argentine football (soccer) referee
Christophe Sanchez, French football player
Daniel Sanchez, French former football striker
Davinson Sánchez, Colombian footballer
Eustorgio Sánchez, Venezuelan footballer
Hugo Sánchez, Mexican soccer player
Lawrie Sanchez, British football manager and former player
Matthew Sanchez (soccer)
Onésimo Sánchez, Spanish football player and manager
Oscar Enrique Sánchez, Guatemalan soccer player
Oswaldo Sánchez, Mexican soccer player
Ricard Sánchez, Spanish footballer
Ricardo Sanchez (footballer), Mexican footballer
Víctor Sánchez (footballer, born 1976), Spanish footballer and manager
Víctor Sánchez (footballer, born 1987), Spanish footballer
Wellington Sánchez, Ecuadorian football (soccer) player

Gridiron football

Davis Sanchez, NFL and CFL football player
Mark Sanchez, American football player
Rigoberto Sanchez (born 1994), American football player
Zack Sanchez (born 1993), American football player

Tennis

Emilio Sánchez (born 1965), Spanish tennis player; brother of tennis players Arantxa (above) and Javier (below)
José Antonio Sánchez-de Luna, Spanish tennis player
Manuel Sánchez, Mexican tennis player
María José Martínez Sánchez, Spanish tennis player
María Sánchez Lorenzo, Spanish tennis player
Nicolás Almagro Sanchez Rolle (born 1985), Spanish tennis player
Olivia Sanchez, French tennis player

Catholics Named Sanchez

Saints Named Sanchez

Sanchez is derived from Latin sanctus (“holy”) and ez (“of”/“son”).

Sancius, Sanctius, Sancho Lay Catholic Martyred in 851 
Saint Teresa of Avila
José Sánchez del Río
Jenaro Sánchez Delgadillo

Clergy Named Sanchez

 Paul Robert Sanchez (born 1946), Auxiliary Bishop of Brooklyn, and the Titular Bishop of Coeliana

Fictional characters
Franz Sanchez, main criminal in the James Bond movie Licence to Kill
Rick Sanchez, titular character of Rick and Morty
 Paulina Sanchez, a recurring character from Danny Phantom

It may also appear as a second (maternal) surname in Spanish speaking countries:
Penélope Cruz, full name Penélope Cruz Sánchez, Spanish actress
Claudio Suárez, full name Claudio Suárez Sánchez, Mexican former footballer

References 

Spanish-language surnames
Patronymic surnames
Surnames from given names
Surnames of Colombian origin
Surnames of Puerto Rican origin